Cobalt(II) sulfate is any of the inorganic compounds with the formula CoSO4(H2O)x.  Usually cobalt sulfate refers to the hexa- or heptahydrates CoSO4.6H2O or CoSO4.7H2O, respectively. The heptahydrate is a red solid that is soluble in water and methanol. Since cobalt(II) has an odd number of electrons, its salts are paramagnetic.

Preparation, and structure
It forms by the reaction of metallic cobalt, its oxide, hydroxide, or carbonate with aqueous sulfuric acid:
Co  +  H2SO4  +  7 H2O  →  CoSO4(H2O)7  +  H2
CoO  +  H2SO4  +  6 H2O  →  CoSO4(H2O)7

The heptahydrate is only stable at humidity >70% at room temperature, otherwise it converts to the hexahydrate.  The hexahydrate converts to the monohydrate and the anhydrous forms at 100 and 250 °C, respectively.
CoSO4(H2O)7  → CoSO4(H2O)6 +  H2O
CoSO4(H2O)6  → CoSO4(H2O) +  5H2O
CoSO4(H2O)  → CoSO4 +  H2O

The hexahydrate is a metal aquo complex consisting of octahedral [Co(H2O)6]2+ ions associated with sulfate anions (see image in table). The monoclinic heptahydrate has also been characterized by X-ray crystallography. It also features [Co(H2O)6]2+ octahedra as well as one water of crystallization.

Uses and reactions
Cobalt sulfates are important intermediates in the extraction of cobalt from its ores.  Thus, crushed, partially refined ores are treated with sulfuric acid to give red-colored solutions containing cobalt sulfate.

Hydrated cobalt(II) sulfate is used in the preparation of pigments, as well as in the manufacture of other cobalt salts. Cobalt pigment is used in porcelains and glass. Cobalt(II) sulfate is used in storage batteries and electroplating baths, sympathetic inks, and as an additive to soils and animal feeds.  For these purposes, the cobalt sulfate is produced by treating cobalt oxide with sulfuric acid.

Being commonly available commercially, the heptahydrate is a routine source of cobalt in coordination chemistry.

Natural occurrence
Rarely, cobalt(II) sulfate is found in form of few crystallohydrate minerals, occurring among oxidation zones containing primary Co minerals (like skutterudite or cobaltite). These minerals are: biebierite (heptahydrate), moorhouseite (Co,Ni,Mn)SO4.6H2O, aplowite (Co,Mn,Ni)SO4.4H2O and cobaltkieserite (monohydrate).

Health issues
Cobalt is an essential mineral for mammals, but more than a few micrograms per day is harmful.  Although poisonings have rarely resulted from cobalt compounds, their chronic ingestion has caused serious health problems at doses far less than the lethal dose. In 1965, the addition of a cobalt compound to stabilize beer foam in Canada led to a peculiar form of toxin-induced cardiomyopathy, which came to be known as beer drinker's cardiomyopathy.

Furthermore, cobalt(II) sulfate is suspected of causing cancer (i.e., possibly carcinogenic, IARC Group 2B) as per the International Agency for Research on Cancer (IARC) Monographs.

Related compounds
 the Tutton salt K2Co(SO4)2

References

Cobalt(II) compounds
Sulfates
IARC Group 2B carcinogens
Hydrates